Lisandro López (born 2 March 1983), sometimes known as simply Lisandro, is an Argentine professional footballer who plays for Argentine Primera División club Sarmiento. Primarily a striker, he is also capable of playing on the wings.

After starting out at Racing Club in 2003, he spent four years each with Porto in Portugal and Lyon in France, winning eight major titles between the two teams. He also played professionally in Qatar, Brazil and the United States, before returning to Argentina.

López won seven caps for the Argentina national team in four years, having made his debut in 2005.

Club career

Racing Club
López was born in the small town of Rafael Obligado, in Buenos Aires Province's vast agricultural interior region. He arrived at Racing Club at the age of 18 and, just two years later, made his Argentine Primera División debut in the 2003 Clausura; also in the side was a young Diego Milito leading the attack, and his subsequent exit to Genoa opened the doors to a regular first-team spot which López made his own in 2004.

López was crowned top scorer in the 2004 Apertura tournament, going on to score 26 goals in 71 league appearances and over 30 in all competitions. During his spell at the Estadio Presidente Juan Domingo Perón, he was nicknamed Licha.

Porto
In April 2005, López signed for Porto for a transfer fee of €2.3 million, at the same time of compatriot Lucho González. His agents, Global Soccer Agencies (later renamed Rio Football Services), retained 50% of the player's rights– in the same transfer window, Luís Fabiano, whose rights were owned by GSA's sister company, "Global Soccer Investments" (75%), left. He scored seven Primeira Liga goals in his first season in 26 games, repeating the feat the following campaign while appearing in one match less. He also found the net in the 1–1 home draw against Rangers in the 2005–06 UEFA Champions League, adding two to help defeat Hamburger SV (also in that competition but in the following edition, 4–1 home win).

In 2007–08, as the side were crowned league champions for the third consecutive time, López was the competition's top scorer, scoring 24 goals in 27 games and adding three in the season's Champions League. On 20 April 2008, he netted twice – also being booked – in a 2–0 home win against Benfica; an offer from Zenit Saint Petersburg was rejected midway through the campaign, and the Portuguese club eventually bought the remaining economic rights of the player for €4.4 million.

López only scored ten goals in 2008–09, but finished fourth in the scoring list in the Champions League with six, only trailing Lionel Messi, Steven Gerrard and Miroslav Klose. Porto wrapped up the season with the conquest of the Taça de Portugal, and he netted the game's only goal in a victory over Paços de Ferreira.

Lyon

After the sale of Karim Benzema to Real Madrid in the summer of 2009, López replaced him at Lyon, being transferred for a fee of €24 million, plus a €4 million bonus subject to performances. On 8 August, he scored on his Ligue 1 debut from a last-minute free kick at Le Mans, in a 2–2 draw. He added a hat-trick against Anderlecht in the second leg of the Champions League qualifying round, in an eventual 8–2 aggregate win.

On 4 November 2009, López scored a late and decisive equaliser in a group game against Liverpool to ensure qualification for the knockout stage. Four days later he netted twice in three minutes in a 5–5 league draw with Marseille, adding a further three the following month, against Lille; the visitors led 3–1 at half-time, but were eventually defeated 4–3.

On 30 March 2010, López scored twice in the 3–1 home victory against Bordeaux in the Champions League quarter-finals (3–2 aggregate win), but missed the second leg due to suspension. He continued this good form with a goal in Lyon's 2–1 away defeat of Rennes, four days later.

On the final day of the season, López assisted Miralem Pjanić in a 2–0 home win against Le Mans, a result which placed his team second in the league table, with the subsequent direct Champions League qualification. On 9 May 2010, he was named Ligue 1 Footballer of the Year.

López scored in a 3–2 away win over Nancy on 2 October 2010, Lyon's second of the campaign. He added two in the next ligue fixture – one from a penalty kick – a 3–1 defeat of Lille at the Stade de Gerland. On 20 October he found the net again, against Benfica in a 2–0 Champions League group stage win.

After a one-month spell without a goal, López finally added to his account by grabbing a last-minute goal in a 3–1 away win against Lens in November 2010. He added two in another away fixture, against Montpellier (2–1, the second coming in the fifth minute of stoppage time). Three days later Lyon, needing a point to secure passage to the knockout stages of the Champions League, played host to Hapoel Tel Aviv, and he opened the scoring in the 62nd minute of an eventual 2–2 home draw.

López scored again in the next match for OL in a 2–0 win over Toulouse, putting them up to second place in the table. He also found the net in the following game, a 1–1 draw against title holders Marseille at the Stade Vélodrome.

On 6 March 2011, after six scoreless appearances, López scored a hat-trick in the 5–0 thrashing of Arles-Avignon. In the 27th matchday he continued his run, opening the scoring in a 2–0 away win against Sochaux. On 10 April, he netted in the 90th minute in a 3–0 home win over Lens and found the net in the following two home fixtures (both 3–2 wins), against Montpellier and Marseille, with the side eventually finishing in third position. On the final day of the season he scored a goal in the 2–0 victory against Monaco, condemning the opposition to their first relegation in 35 years.

López started 2011–12 in fine form, scoring in the first two games, his first coming in the early stages of a 3–1 win at Nice. The following weekend, against newly promoted Ajaccio, he hit the post twice in the first ten minutes and had several shots saved by Guillermo Ochoa, but was able to salvage a point for new coach Rémi Garde on his home debut with a header in the 83rd minute.

On 8 January 2012, López scored a hat-trick in a 3–1 win at Lyon-Duchère for the Coupe de France. Three days later, he netted the 2–1 winner against Lille in the Coupe de la Ligue, in the 64th minute. On the 22nd, in his 100th competitive match for Lyon, he scored against Luçon  in the French Cup round of 32.

On 28 April 2012, López helped grab victory in the French Cup final, scoring the game's only goal against Quevilly. In late April of the following year, he announced he was leaving the club in the summer transfer window, with Garde commenting:

Al-Gharafa and Internacional
On 8 August 2013, López signed for Qatari club Al-Gharafa for a fee of €7.2 million. In late February 2015 he changed countries again, joining Brazil's Internacional on a two-year deal.

Later years
On 1 January 2016, two months shy of his 33rd birthday, López returned to Racing Club on a free transfer which had been agreed the previous month. In the 2018–19 season, he scored 17 league goals to lead the individual charts and help his team win the national championship for the 18th time in their history.

On 25 January 2021, López joined Major League Soccer club Atlanta United. After four appearances in league and continental competitions, he terminated his contract by mutual consent following the death of his father.

López returned to Racing for a third stint on 22 June 2021, signing a one-year deal with the option of ending it after six months. On 29 November, the 38-year-old announced that he would retire after the match against Godoy Cruz the following month. One month later, however, he went back on his word and agreed to a one-year contract with Sarmiento.

International career
In 2005, López was called up to the Argentina national team by José Pékerman, and he made his debut against Mexico on 10 March in a 1–1 friendly draw. After solid Porto performances, he was summoned three years later by Alfio Basile for exhibition games with Egypt, Mexico, the United States and Belarus.

On 12 August 2009, López scored one goal in Argentina's 3–2 victory over Russia at the Lokomotiv Stadium in Moscow. Nine days later, he was called by national team boss Diego Maradona for the decisive matches against Brazil and Paraguay for the 2010 FIFA World Cup qualification, but was overlooked for the final stages in South Africa.

Personal life
López is of Chilean descent since his mother is Chilean.

Career statistics

Club

International goals
Scores and results list Argentina's goal tally first, score column indicates score after each López goal.

Honours
Porto
Primeira Liga: 2005–06, 2006–07, 2007–08, 2008–09
Taça de Portugal: 2005–06, 2008–09
Supertaça Cândido de Oliveira: 2006

Lyon
Coupe de France: 2011–12

Internacional
Campeonato Gaúcho: 2015

Racing Club	
Argentine Primera División: 2018–19
Trofeo de Campeones: 2019

Individual
Argentine Primera División top scorer: 2004 Apertura, 2018–19
SJPF Player of the Month: January 2008, February 2008
Bola de Prata: 2007–08
LPFP Primeira Liga Player of the Year: 2007–08
CNID Footballer of the Year: 2008
UNFP Ligue 1 Player of the Month: August 2009
UNFP Ligue 1 Player of the Year: 2009–10
UNFP Ligue 1 Team of the Year: 2009–10
Argentine Primera División Best Player: 2018–19
Argentine Primera División Best Forward: 2018–19
Argentine Primera División Team of the Year: 2018–19

References

External links

1983 births
Living people
People from Rojas Partido
Sportspeople from Buenos Aires Province
Argentine sportspeople of Chilean descent
Argentine footballers
Association football forwards
Argentine Primera División players
Racing Club de Avellaneda footballers
Club Atlético Sarmiento footballers
Primeira Liga players
FC Porto players
Ligue 1 players
Olympique Lyonnais players
Qatar Stars League players
Al-Gharafa SC players
Campeonato Brasileiro Série A players
Sport Club Internacional players
Major League Soccer players
Atlanta United FC players
Argentina international footballers
Argentine expatriate footballers
Expatriate footballers in Portugal
Expatriate footballers in France
Expatriate footballers in Qatar
Expatriate footballers in Brazil
Expatriate soccer players in the United States
Argentine expatriate sportspeople in Portugal
Argentine expatriate sportspeople in France
Argentine expatriate sportspeople in Qatar
Argentine expatriate sportspeople in Brazil
Argentine expatriate sportspeople in the United States